Carlos Agustín Moreno Luna (born 29 January 1998) is a Mexican professional footballer who plays as a goalkeeper for Liga MX club Pachuca.

Club career
A youth product of Pachuca since the age of 10, Moreno joined the Chilean club Everton on loan in 2018. He made his senior debut with Everton in a 0–0 Copa Chile tie with C.D. Cobresal on 10 June 2018.

International career
Moreno was called up as the third goalkeeper at the 2020 CONCACAF Men's Olympic Qualifying Championship, where Mexico won the competition.

Career statistics

Club

Honours
Pachuca
Liga MX: Apertura 2022

Mexico U23
CONCACAF Olympic Qualifying Championship: 2020

References

External links

1998 births
Living people
People from Tecomán, Colima
Mexico youth international footballers
Association football goalkeepers
C.F. Pachuca players
Everton de Viña del Mar footballers
Chilean Primera División players
Mexican expatriate footballers
Mexican expatriate sportspeople in Chile
Expatriate footballers in Chile
Footballers from Colima
Liga Premier de México players
Tercera División de México players
Mexican footballers